Pierre Morange (born September 8, 1956 at Clermont-Ferrand, in Puy-de-Dôme) is a French politician.

He has been elected deputy of the 6th division of the Yvelines. From February 2, 1999 to June 6, 2002, Morange operated as a deputy of the French National Assembly, becoming re-elected on June 10, 2007.

Pierre Morange runs under the Union for a Popular Movement (UMP), political party of the President of France Nicolas Sarkozy.

From June 25, 1995 to March 18, 2001 he served as Mayor of Chambourcy, in the Yvelines.

References

External links
 Pierre Morange's official site

1956 births
Living people
Union for a Popular Movement politicians
Deputies of the 12th National Assembly of the French Fifth Republic
Deputies of the 13th National Assembly of the French Fifth Republic
Deputies of the 14th National Assembly of the French Fifth Republic
Members of Parliament for Yvelines